Harbinger is singer–songwriter Paula Cole's debut album. It was released through Imago Records, but just months after its release the company folded, so promotion for Harbinger was almost non-existent. A video was shot for the first single, "I Am So Ordinary", and is available on iTunes. There are two different covers for the album, which was re-released by Warner Brothers, who picked up Cole's contract in 1995 after absorbing Imago when it folded.

Track listing
All tracks composed by Paula Cole
"Happy Home"
"I Am So Ordinary"
"Saturn Girl"
"Watch the Woman's Hands"
"Bethlehem"
"Chiaroscuro"
"Black Boots"
"Oh John"
"Our Revenge"
"Dear Gertrude"
"Hitler's Brothers"
"She Can't Feel Anything Anymore"
"Garden of Eden"
"The Ladder"

 Released singles included "I Am So Ordinary" and "Bethlehem".

Personnel
 Kevin Barry - acoustic guitar, high-string guitar
 Paul Bushnell - bass
 Jay Bellerose - drums, instruments [box]
 Gerry Leonard - acoustic guitar, electric guitar, E-Bow, Allen guitar, Leslie guitar
 Mark Hutchins - hihat, programming, tambourine, handclaps
 Erik Friedlander - cello
 Juliet Hafner - viola
 Laura Seaton - violin
 Mary Rowell - violin
 Eileen Ivers - violin
 Paula Cole - vocals, keyboards

1994 debut albums
Paula Cole albums